WVTY (92.1 FM, "92-1 VTY Country") is a country music-formatted radio station in Racine in the U.S. state of Wisconsin. It serves Racine, Kenosha and Milwaukee's southern suburbs. WVTY is owned by David Magnum, through licensee Magnum Communications, Inc., along with sister stations WRJN and West Bend-based WIBD and WMBZ.  Its studios are in Racine and the transmitter site is in Raymond (at the former transmitter site of WPXE-TV).

History

Beautiful music (1961-1986) 
The station signed on in 1961 as WFNY, (taken from owner Jerome Feeny's name) broadcasting a beautiful music format. Eventually an automated music playback system was installed, but live announcers remained on staff. Some of the air personalities over the years have included Paul Weyrich, Lou Rugani, Dave Garland, Don Jensen, Jerry Grimmer, Kevin Kellogg, Mike Kristof, Tim Yorgan, Chris Morreau, Gene Miller, Mike Petersen, and Frank Ricchio.

Adult contemporary (1986-1988) 
WFNY was sold in 1986 and the format was flipped to adult contemporary as WHKQ.

Country (1988-1991) 
Two years later, WHKQ became "Country 92".

Easy listening (1991-1997) 
The station was sold once again in 1991, with the format returning to its easy listening origins. Later, the station adopted the WEZY call letters using the branding "EZ92 WEZY" The easy listening format would simulcast on sister WRJN overnights from midnight-7AM.

Adult contemporary (1997-2014) 
In 1997, Bliss Communications, owners of eight radio stations in Wisconsin and numerous newspapers in Wisconsin, Illinois and Michigan, purchased the station and its sister, WRJN. On December 26, 1997, the station adopted an adult contemporary format. On January 2, 2007, WEZY changed its moniker to "Lite Rock 92.1". On June 25, 2014, Bliss Communications announced that it would sell WEZY and WRJN, along with WBKV and WBWI-FM in West Bend, to David Magnum's Magnum Communications, Inc. The sale, at a price of $2.25 million, was consummated on October 31, 2014.

Country (2014-2015) 
On December 2, 2014, at 12:55 a.m., the station flipped to country music as Q92; afterward, the station changed its call letters to WMKQ.

Adult hits (2015-2018) 
On May 29, 2015, WMKQ flipped to adult hits as 92.1 The Lake; this move came the same day that competing station WLWK, which also branded as The Lake with an identical logo, flipped to country itself as WKTI-FM. The de facto "swap" was intentional, with Magnum citing the "heritage" of the format in Milwaukee, and the decision by the station's new owner, The E.W. Scripps Company, to drop it, as justification for the abrupt change. The change in branding and Magnum's appropriation of WKTI's former branding caught Scripps off-guard; representatives of both companies indicated that they were in discussions over the matter. On June 7, 2015, WMKQ changed their call letters to WVTY; Radio Insight also reported that Magnum had registered new domain names and social media accounts with different possible brands, 92.1 The Shore and Variety 92.1. On June 29, 2015, WVTY rebranded as 92.1 The Shore.

Country (2018-present) 
On October 30, 2018, in anticipation of WKTI's November 1 flip from country to ESPN Radio as part of its sale by Scripps to Good Karma Brands, WVTY returned to country itself as 92.1 VTY Country. As with its use of the former Lake branding earlier, the station's new branding and logo is based heavily on the branding previously used by WKTI. Magnum Communications also purchased advertising time on the station to promote WVTY and West Bend sister station WMBZ to its former listeners.

Past logos

References

External links

VTY
Radio stations established in 1961
Country radio stations in the United States